Dan Bleckinger (born May 27, 1947) is an American former professional tennis player.

Bleckinger, raised in Oshkosh, Wisconsin, played collegiate tennis for both the University of Wisconsin and the University of Utah. A Big 10 singles champion in his freshman season at Wisconsin, Bleckinger spent his final two years with Utah, earning All-American honors in 1969 and 1970. He reached the singles third round of the 1972 Wimbledon Championships as a qualifier and was eliminated by the fifth-seeded Jan Kodeš.

References

External links
 
 

1947 births
Living people
American male tennis players
Wisconsin Badgers men's tennis players
Utah Utes men's tennis players
Tennis people from Wisconsin
Sportspeople from Oshkosh, Wisconsin